Nasra bint ʿAdlan, Arabic: نصرة بنت عدلان (fl.1800s - 1850s) was a Sudanese noblewoman, power-broker, estate manager and enslaver, whose court was visited by Karl Richard Lepsius.

Biography 
Bint 'Adlan was born in the early 1800s, in or close to Sennar. Her mother was a princess of the Funj royal house; her father Muhammed 'Adlan was an aristocrat and military commander, descended from Muhammad Abu Likaylik. In 1821 the Turkish army conquered Funj state and her father was assassinated; bint 'Adlan survived.

Her first husband was a merchant called Muhammad Sandaluba. They had a daughter named Dawwa and divided their time between Sennar and their estate at Maranjan, near Wad Madani. After the death of Sandaluba, bint 'Adlan remarried, this time to Daf ʿ Allah Muhammad, who was a district governor at Wad Madani. In the 1830s they built a palace and a village called Suriba, which served it. During this time the couple became more involved in commercial ventures, which included agriculture and prostitution, both of which were based on the labour of enslaved people.

As the manager of her own estates, and connected to high-ranking officials through her family and wealth, bint 'Adlan was an influential woman in the region. She supported Nasir wad Abakr to bid for the throne of Taqali.

She died between 1852 and 1860; after her death the Suriba palace became a ruin. The archaeologist Karl Richard Lepsius had visited bint 'Adlan and an account of her life was published in 1853 in his work Letters from Egypt, Ethiopia, and the Peninsula of Sinai.

References

External links 
Letters from Egypt, Ethiopia, and the Peninsula of Sinai (read online)

Year of birth unknown
Year of death unknown
19th-century Sudanese people
Sudanese women
Sudanese royalty